"Crazy" is a single released in 2003 by the girl group, Dream. It was the group's last single before disbanding, until their reunion in 2015.

Content
"Crazy" features a guest appearance by rapper Loon. The song was originally titled "Krazy" and featured rapper Eve, but the name was changed to "Crazy". However, the digital version of Reality lists the track under its original title of "Krazy". It was also Dream's only single to feature member Kasey Sheridan.

Music video
The music video took place in a Middle Eastern setting. It showed the girls wearing harem-like costumes and dancing in a very provocative style. According to MTV News, this new "sexed-up" style was not welcomed by the group and was one of the factors that led to their break-up. Matthew Rolston directed the video.

Track listings
US Promo
 Crazy [Main Version]
 Crazy [Main Version W/O Rap]
 Crazy [Instrumental]

Charts

References

External links
full video at MTV News
MTV News - Where Ya Been? Dream Wake Up (April 12, 2006)

2003 singles
Dream (American group) songs
Bad Boy Records singles
Song recordings produced by Scott Storch
Songs written by Adonis Shropshire
Songs written by Scott Storch
2003 songs
Songs written by Loon (rapper)